Poland participated in and won the Junior Eurovision Song Contest 2018 which took place on 25 November 2018 in Minsk, Belarus. The Polish broadcaster Telewizja Polska (TVP) was responsible for organising their entry for the contest. Roksana Węgiel was internally selected on 21 September 2018 as the Polish representative, competing with the song "Anyone I Want to Be". She won the contest with a total of 215 points.

Background

Prior to the 2018 Contest, Poland has participated in the Junior Eurovision Song Contest four times. In 2003 and 2004, Poland ended in last place and they decided not to participate from 2005 to 2015. The country returned successfully in 2016. Olivia Wieczorek was selected to represent the nation that year with the song "Nie zapomnij". Olivia ended in 11th place out of 17 entries with 60 points. In 2017, Alicja Rega was selected to represent Poland with the song "Mój dom". She ended up 8th of 16 entries with 138 points.

Before Junior Eurovision

TVP confirmed it's intention to participate in December 2017. According to the financial plans of the broadcaster, a national final was to be organised to select the Polish representatives, with many artists confirming their intention to participate in a national selection, such as Natalia Wawrzyńczyk, Arfik, Ula Kowalska, Julia Chmielarska, Ula Dorosz and Wiktoria Zwolińska. Among rumoured acts to participate in the national final were also Paula Biskup with the song "Wyliczanka", as well as thirteen-year-old artist Roksana Węgiel, the winner of the first edition of the Polish version of The Voice Kids. In September 2018, composer Agnieszka Wiechnik made an official request to TVP to organise a national final.

On 21 September 2018, the Polish broadcaster revealed that they had chosen Roksana Węgiel internally in order to represent Poland in the Junior Eurovision Song Contest 2018. TVP general director Jacek Kurski later confirmed choice of Roksana Węgiel was his "dictator-like" decision in consultation with the producer Konrad Smuga, based on the results of the televote and the entire selection process included in the first edition of The Voice Kids. Her entry, "Anyone I Want to Be", written by Maegan Cottone, Nathan Duvall, Cutfather, Peter Wallevik, Daniel Davidsen, Małgorzata Uściłowska and Patryk Kumór, was presented to the public on 6 November 2018, accompanied by an official music video.

Artist and song information

Roksana Węgiel

Roksana Węgiel (born 11 January 2005) is a Polish singer who won the first edition of The Voice Kids Poland. She represented Poland at the Junior Eurovision Song Contest 2018 in Minsk, Belarus.

In October 2018, she released the single "Zatrzymać Chwilę" which she recorded together with Edyta Górniak.

At Junior Eurovision
During the opening ceremony and the running order draw which both took place on 19 November 2018, Poland was drawn to perform twentieth (last) on 25 November 2018, following Malta.

Voting

Detailed voting results

References

Junior Eurovision Song Contest
Poland
Junior